The Legend of the White Snake is a 2019 streaming television series starring Ju Jingyi and Yu Menglong. It is based on the Chinese folk legend Legend of the White Snake. The series airs on iQiyi starting April 3, 2019.

Synopsis 
Based on the folk legend of the same name, the series is set in the Southern Song Dynasty and focuses on the romance between Xu Xian, a physician based in Lin’an, and Bai Suzhen, a 1000-year-old white snake spirit that has taken the form of a woman. Xu and Bai’s cross-species love is opposed by Jin Ruyi, the young daughter of Xu’s master who is infatuated with Xu. Ruyi’s obsession with Xu creates a grudge between her and Bai. Xu and Bai’s relationship was also initially opposed by Fahai, an orthodox Buddhist monk who harbored a bias against demons. Throughout the series, Bai is accompanied by Xiao Qing, a 500 year-old green snake spirit who is later revealed to be a demigod. Qing considers Bai as her elder sister after and remains loyal to her.

Cast

Main
 Ju Jingyi as Bai Suzhen, a 1000 year-old white snake spirit who cultivated alongside Jingsong on Mount Emei before moving to Lin’an. Bai is noted for her beauty, intelligence, and righteous nature. She falls in love with Xu Xian and opens the Baohe Clinic with him. She is close friends with Xiao Qing. 
 Yu Menglong as Xu Xian, a kind hearted and intelligent physician who comes from a wealthy family. Due to his parents’ untimely deaths, Xu was raised by his older sister, Xu Jiaorong. Previously worked for Jinshi Clinic before opening Baohe Clinic with his wife, Suzhen.
 Xiao Yan as Xiao Qing, a 500 year-old green snake spirit who is the daughter of snake spirit Yu Furong and the Dragon King Ao Guang, making her a demigod. Her mother was killed because of her relationship with Ao Guang, as Heaven did not permit love between demons and gods, though her father was not because Jade Lotus refused to reveal his identity. Qing did not learn of her demigod status until late in the series and eventually reconciled with her father. 
 Pei Zitian as Fahai, a Buddhist monk from Jinshan Temple. His obsession with eliminating demons resulted in him strengthening the Mind Demon. After reaching enlightenment, Fahai helps Hanwen save Suzhen from her death.
 Yu Lang as Jin Ruyi, owner of Jinshi Clinic who is in love with Xu, whom she refers to as Hanwen. Wang Daoling, a frog spirit, claims her to be the reincarnation of his previous love. Ruyi's hatred and jealousy towards Suzhen allows the Mind Demon to reside in her. Realizing the sins which the Mind Demon tricked her into committing, Ruyi kills herself in a futile attempt to also kill the Mind Demon.

Supporting cast
 Nie Zihao as Jingsong, a golden mouse spirit who is a close friend of Suzhen. His jealousy towards Xu drove a wedge between him and Suzhen, though they later reconcile when Jingsong helps Suzhen save Xu. While helping Suzhen, Jingsong used magic that quickly depleted all his years of cultivation. Suzhen believed Jingsong's soul had been scattered as a result, although it was later revealed that his good deed pleased Heaven and allowed him to be reborn, albeit in the form of a golden squirrel.  
 Feng Jianyu as Zhang Yutang, an herb collector who worked for Baohe Clinic. He falls in love with Qing, who helps him learn of his identity as a nobleman who was kidnapped as a child. 
 Li Lin as Li Gongfu. Brother-in-law of Xu and husband of Xu Jiaorong. Li came from a poor family, but was the only suitor of Jiaorong who agreed to allow Xu Xian to live with them after marriage. Li works as a county official for Lin’an.
 Zeng Yunzhen as Xu Jiaorong. Jiaorong raised her brother Xu Xian from a young age. She is skilled in housework and wants the best for her younger brother. 
 Cecilia Yip as Xu Xian's mother
 Maggie Chen as Yu Furong, Qing’s mother. Yu’s relationship with the Dragon King Ao Guang results in her death. She refuses to reveal Ao as the one whom she had an affair with, thus sparing him.
 Tse Kwan-ho as Xu Huairen
 Wang Weiyuan as Wao Daoling. A frog spirit who is in love with Jin Ruyi. He goes to great lengths to please her, though he eventually dies at her hands.
 Huang Kaijie as Xu Shilin 
 Zhao Yingzi as Li Bilian
 Choenyi Tsering as Lady Wu
 Yi Yizi as Hu Kexin, a fox spirit that steals the hearts of men. She collaborates with Jingsong, who wants to kill Xu Xian. Hu is killed by Fahai.
 Tang Zhenye as Prime Minister Liang 
 David Wu as Lü Dongbin 
 Sunny Tu as Guanyin 
 Wang Weiguo as Jade Emperor
 Zhu Longguang as Buddha
 Heidi Wang as Queen Mother
 Chen Chongyuan as Wu Guibao 
 Liao Pengfei as Ah Luo 
 Fan Wendong as Xie Daqian 
 Wang Ronghong as He Dagu 
 Shen Baoping as Clan Master Lingyou
 Hou Changrong as Dragon King Ao Guang. Ao was deeply in love with Yu Furong despite Heaven’s Law forbidding them from being together. After Yu’s death, Ao refuses to acknowledge Qing as his daughter and sends the Four Immortals to guard over Qing at the West Lake. At the end of the series, Ao sincerely apologizes to his daughter for his cowardice and invites her to stay with him at the Crystal Palace.
 Jackson Lou as Pagoda-Bearing Heavenly King Li
 Fang Yilun as Prince Mu, close friend of Xu Xian.
 Yao Tongtong as Princess Consort Mu
 Ma Shuliang as Mr. Jin
 Liu Lifei as Yinxiang 
 Zhang Bowen as Changsheng

Production
The series was filmed from March to July 2018.

The series is primarily based on the 1992 television series adaptation of the folk tale legend. Cecilia Yip, who played Xu Xian in the 1992 television series adaptation of the folk tale legend, plays Xu Xian's mother. Maggie Chen, who played Xiao Qing in the 1992 television series adaptation of the folk tale legend, plays Yu Furong, Qing’s mother in the series.

Soundtrack
Qian Nian Deng Yi Hui (A Millennium's Wait for a Return) performed by Ju Jingyi
Du Qing (Passing Feelings) performed by Ju Jingyi
Qing Cheng Shan Xia Bai Suzhen (Bai Suzhen under Mount Qingcheng) performed by Ju Jingyi

Awards and nominations

International broadcast

References 

Chinese romantic fantasy television series
2019 Chinese television series debuts
Works based on the Legend of the White Snake
IQIYI original programming
Chinese web series
2019 Chinese television series endings
2019 web series debuts
Television series by iQiyi Pictures